The Crusaders made their début season in the Super League in 2009, in their fifth year of existence. They also competed for the 2009 Challenge Cup.

Transfers
Transfers for 2009 (In)

Transfers for 2009 (Out)

2009 squad

Fixtures and results

League table

Notes

 Game rearranged to 30 May 2009.

References

External links
 Celtic Crusaders' official website

Crusaders Rugby League seasons
Celtic Crusaders season
2009 in Welsh rugby league